The 1891 Mercer Baptists football team represented Mercer University in their inaugural season, the 1891 college football season. They finished with a record of 0–2 and were outscored by their opponents 2–70.

Schedule

References

Mercer
Mercer Bears football seasons
College football winless seasons
Mercer Baptists football